Belur Industrial Area (Abbreviation : BIA)  is an industrial area of the Dharwad city in India and it is one of the biggest industrial areas in Karnataka. lies on the Dharwad-Belgaum Highway. It houses small, medium, and large-scale industries. The industrial area is known for engineering, electrical goods such as: CNC Machine tools, GDC dies & moulds transformers, motors and generators, textile (silk), hydraulics, machine tool industries and Rubber moulding industries.

References

Industrial parks in India
Neighborhoods in Dharwad

Dharwad district
Karnataka